MarJon Beauchamp (born October 12, 2000) is an American professional basketball player for the Milwaukee Bucks of the National Basketball Association (NBA). He played college basketball for the Yakima Valley Yaks.

High school career
Entering high school, Beauchamp moved from his hometown of Yakima, Washington, to Seattle to play basketball at Nathan Hale High School under head coach Brandon Roy and to face stronger competition. As a freshman, he was a deep reserve for a team that featured top recruits Michael Porter Jr. and Jontay Porter. Nathan Hale finished with a 29–0 record, won the Washington Interscholastic Activities Association Class 3A state title, and captured the No. 1 national ranking from MaxPreps. As a sophomore, Beauchamp transferred to Garfield High School in Seattle. He moved to the school with former Nathan Hale coach Brandon Roy and teammate P. J. Fuller. He won his second straight Class 4A state championship and helped Garfield reach the quarterfinals at High School Nationals.

For his junior season, Beauchamp transferred to Rainier Beach High School in Seattle, citing a lack of motivation in class and sickness from mold in his house during his time at Garfield. He moved to the South End, within school boundaries, and as a result was ruled eligible to play basketball for his new school. After leading Rainier Beach to league and district titles, he was named most valuable player of the Seattle 3A Metro League. Beauchamp guided his team to a Class 3A state semifinal appearance and fifth place in the state tournament. He averaged 26 points, 11 rebounds, and five assists per game and was named to the USA Today All-USA Washington second team, Associated Press Class 3A All-State first team, and The Seattle Times All-State second team. Beauchamp transferred to Dream City Christian School, a school in Glendale, Arizona with a new basketball program, for his senior season. After finishing his high school basketball career he went back to his hometown of Yakima to graduate from Eisenhower High School.

Recruiting
After his freshman season, Beauchamp held offers from four NCAA Division I programs, including Washington. His success on the Amateur Athletic Union circuit helped him earn a five-star rating from recruiting websites before his junior season. Beauchamp was rated a consensus four-star recruit by major recruiting services at the end of his high school career. On August 1, 2019, he announced that he would forgo college basketball.

College career
Following high school, Beauchamp trained with Chameleon BX, a training program based in San Francisco, to prepare for the 2021 NBA draft. After over six months with the program, he returned to Washington due to the COVID-19 pandemic and began reconsidering his college options. In March 2021, Beauchamp joined the basketball team at Yakima Valley College in his hometown, being drawn by his friendship with players on the team. In his college debut on April 20, 2021, Beauchamp had nine points and nine rebounds in a 99–90 loss over Treasure Valley, and felt lingering respiratory limitations. On June 1, he recorded a career-high 50 points and 11 rebounds in a 107–106 overtime loss to Treasure Valley. As a freshman, Beauchamp averaged 30.7 points, 10.5 rebounds and 4.8 assists per game through 12 games, leading the Northwest Athletic Conference in scoring. He drew attention from Washington, Washington State, Oregon, Texas Tech, Arkansas and LSU, but opted to forgo attending a Division I university due to concerns about his amateur status.

Professional career

NBA G League Ignite (2021–2022)
On September 23, 2021, Beauchamp signed with the NBA G League Ignite of the NBA G League. He averaged 15.1 points, 7.3 rebounds and 2.3 assists per game.

Milwaukee Bucks (2022–present)
On June 23, 2022, the Milwaukee Bucks drafted him 24th overall in the 2022 NBA draft. Beauchamp joined the Bucks' 2022 NBA Summer League roster. In his Summer League debut, Beauchamp scored sixteen points in a 94–90 win over the Brooklyn Nets. On July 7, 2022, Beauchamp signed a rookie-scale contract with the Bucks. On November 9, Beauchamp set a career-high with 19 points scored, along with 8 rebounds grabbed, during a 136–132 win over the Oklahoma City Thunder. On November 14, Beauchamp set a new career–high with 20 points during a 121–106 loss to the Atlanta Hawks.

Career statistics

College

|-
| style="text-align:left;"| 2020-21
| style="text-align:left;"| Yakima Valley
| 12 || 10 || 36.4 || .525 || .398 || .768 || 10.5 || 4.8 || 1.3 || 1.1 || 30.7
|- class="sortbottom"
| style="text-align:center;" colspan="2"| Career
| 12 || 10 || 36.4 || .525 || .398 || .768 || 10.5 || 4.8 || 1.3 || 1.1 || 30.7

Personal life
Beauchamp is a Christian. Beauchamp's father, Jon, played college basketball for Eastern Washington and Highline College. Jon is a former radio personality and works in customer relations in Bellevue, Washington. Beauchamp is of Native American descent, from the Mission Indians and La Jolla Band of Luiseño Indians. He is the grandson of Henry Beauchamp, the first African American mayor of Yakima.

References

External links

Yakima Valley Yaks bio

2000 births
Living people
21st-century African-American sportspeople
African-American basketball players
American men's basketball players
Basketball players from Seattle
Junior college men's basketball players in the United States
Milwaukee Bucks draft picks
Milwaukee Bucks players
Native American basketball players
NBA G League Ignite players
Small forwards